The Nikon D780 is a full-frame DSLR camera announced by Nikon on January 6, 2020. It was released for purchase on January 23, 2020.
It is the successor to the Nikon D750.



Compared to the Nikon D750

As compared to the previous Nikon D750, this camera body has an upgraded EXPEED 6 processor (the D750 had an EXPEED 4 processor), a BSI CMOS sensor that allows for better low-light performance (the D750 had an ISO range of 100–12,800, where the D780 has a range of 100–51,200), and a faster maximum shutter speed of 1/8000 (as compared to 1/4000 on the D750). For continuous shooting, the D780 can shoot up to 7 frames per second (fps), where the D750 was capable of shooting up to 6.5 fps. In "live view" mode, continuous shooting up to 12 fps is possible. While it does not have a built-in flash as the D750 does, nor an AF-assist lamp, it has a standard hot shoe for use with an external flash. With the switch to USB-C, the camera can recharge the EN-EL15b battery internally. The D780 also does not have the facility to add a battery grip with portrait orientation shooting controls.

Memory card
The D780 eschews the newer XQD card format used by most recent Nikon camera releases in favour of SD cards, of which it can accept two.

Reception
DPReview calls the D780 "a DSLR that's learned a lot from mirrorless". They go on to note differences between the D750 and D780, finishing with the observation that those invested in Nikon F-mount lenses should consider this body if it meets their needs. Those not already invested in F-mount lenses should instead consider the Nikon Z 6.

References

External links

 Nikon D780, Nikon

D780
D780
Live-preview digital cameras
Cameras introduced in 2020
Full-frame DSLR cameras